Olivier Rochon (born July 30, 1989) is a Canadian freestyle skier. Rochon was the World Cup champion during the 2011-12 season in aerials.

World Cup Podiums

References

External links
 Olivier Rochon at Freestyle Skiing Canada
 
 
 

1989 births
Living people
Canadian male freestyle skiers
Freestyle skiers at the 2018 Winter Olympics
Olympic freestyle skiers of Canada
Sportspeople from Bucharest